Chen Jiannian (born 1 August 1967) tribal name Pau-dull, is a Taiwanese Puyuma singer.

Discography
Haiyang 1999《海洋》
Dadi 2002《大地》

References

1967 births
Living people
Place of birth missing (living people)
Puyuma people
Taiwanese male singers